Spring Creek Mountain is a summit of the South Mountains in Juab County, Utah, but the mountain lies partly within White Pine County, Nevada.

References 

Mountains of Juab County, Utah
Mountains of White Pine County, Nevada